Aristonicus (Latin; Greek  Aristonikos) of Tarentum was the author of a work on Greek mythology which ancient sources often refer to. He is perhaps the same as the one mentioned by Athenaeus 1.20, but nothing is known about him.

References

Ancient Greek writers
Year of birth unknown
Year of death unknown